Leo Stefan (born 22 February 1970) is a German ice hockey player. He competed in the men's tournament at the 1994 Winter Olympics.

Career statistics

Regular season and playoffs

International

References

1970 births
Living people
German ice hockey players
Olympic ice hockey players of Germany
Ice hockey players at the 1994 Winter Olympics
Sportspeople from Chelyabinsk